This is a list of Edmonton Oilers award winners.

League awards

Team trophies

Individual awards

All-Stars

WHA First and Second Team All-Stars

NHL first and second team All-Stars
The NHL first and second team All-Stars are the top players at each position as voted on by the Professional Hockey Writers' Association.

NHL All-Rookie Team
The NHL All-Rookie Team consists of the top rookies at each position as voted on by the Professional Hockey Writers' Association.

All-Star Game selections
The National Hockey League All-Star Game is a mid-season exhibition game held annually between many of the top players of each season. Thirty-three All-Star Games have been held since the Oilers entered the league in 1979, with at least one player chosen to represent the Oilers in each year except 2004. The All-Star game has not been held in various years: 1979 and 1987 due to the 1979 Challenge Cup and Rendez-vous '87 series between the NHL and the Soviet national team, respectively, 1995, 2005, and 2013 as a result of labor stoppages, 2006, 2010, and 2014 because of the Winter Olympic Games, and 2021 as a result of the COVID-19 pandemic. Edmonton has hosted one of the games. The 40th took place at Northlands Coliseum.

 Selected by fan vote
 Selected as one of four "last men in" by fan vote
 All-Star Game Most Valuable Player

All-Star Game replacement events
 Selected by fan vote

Career achievements

Hockey Hall of Fame
The following is a list of Edmonton Oilers who have been enshrined in the Hockey Hall of Fame.

Foster Hewitt Memorial Award
One member of the Edmonton Oilers organization has been honored with the Foster Hewitt Memorial Award. The award is presented by the Hockey Hall of Fame to members of the radio and television industry who make outstanding contributions to their profession and the game of ice hockey during their broadcasting career.

Retired numbers

The Edmonton Oilers have retired eight of their jersey numbers. Wayne Gretzky's number 99 was also retired league-wide on February 6, 2000.

Team awards

Community Service Award
The Community Service Award is an annual award given to a player chosen by the Oilers Hockey Operations department.

Defenceman of the Year
The Defenceman of the Year award is an annual award given to the team's top defenceman as chosen by the Edmonton sports media.

Molson Cup
The Molson Cup is an annual award given to "the player who accumulates the most votes in the three-star voting process" during the regular season.

Most Popular Player
The Most Popular Player award is an annual award given to the team's most popular player as "selected by an on-line vote of Oilers fans."

Top Defensive Forward
The Top Defensive Forward award is an annual award given to the team's top defensive forward as "selected by an on-line vote of Oilers fans."

Top First Year Oiler
The Top First Year Oiler award is an annual award given to the team's top first year player as "selected by an on-line vote of Oilers fans."
 Presented to the top playoff performer.

Unsung Hero
The Unsung Hero award is an annual award given to the team's unsung hero as "selected by an on-line vote of Oilers fans."

Zane Feldman Trophy
The Zane Feldman Trophy is an annual award given to the team's most valuable player as "selected by an on-line vote of Oilers fans."

Other awards

See also
List of National Hockey League awards

References

Edmonton Oilers
award